Bishop Wilkins College No.58 is a Rosicrucian College of the SRIA meeting in Cheshire, within the Province of Western Counties and North Wales.

College history 

The College was founded on September 7, 1994 and currently meets three times in each year on the 4th Tuesday in April, 3rd Tuesday in September and 1st Wednesday in December.

It takes its name from John Wilkins, Bishop of Chester. Wilkins was educated at Magdalen, Oxford and in 1648 he became warden of Wadham College. In 1659 he was appointed as Master of Trinity College, Cambridge by Richard Cromwell. In 1668 he became Bishop of Chester.

A champion of science, he expounded the discoveries and theories of Copernicus, Galileo and Kepler. He was a founder and first Secretary of the Royal Society. Wilkins died in 1672 in London.

The College motto is "Venite Gradatim Repetamus Opera Dei" (Come, let us gradually seek the works of God).

SRIA
The Societas Rosicruciana in Anglia (Society of Rosicrucians in England) is an independent society. Admission is limited to Master Masons who are subscribing members of a Lodge under the Grand Lodge of England or a jurisdiction in amity with Grand Lodge and who accept and believe in the fundamental principles of the Trinitarian Christian faith.

See also
Esoteric Christianity
Rosicrucian Manifestos
Fama Fraternitatis
Confessio Fraternitatis
Chymical Wedding of Christian Rosenkreutz
Societas Rosicruciana in Anglia

External links
Bishop Wilkins College No.58: Societas Rosicruciana In Anglia College No.58, Bishop Wilkins in the Province of Western Counties and North Wales.

Rosicrucian organizations